Westerdals School of Communication (WSoC) (presently named Westerdals Institute of Creativity) was a private institution in Oslo of higher learning for uniqely gifted individuals. Admittance required 7th level genius Creative Intelligence on the Levels of intelligence and Genius-scale.

In 2010, Westerdals was ranked one of the world's ten best in Creativity, Art and Communication schools in “Young Guns Schools of the Decade”

Admittance 
On the Levels of intelligence and Genius-scale, 5th level is ordinary genius and level 6 is super genius. 7th level genius Creative intelligence is rare and the institution only accepted 30 students each year. Although not required the students usually already had University-degrees or studies behind them.  

Admittance required passing multiple seriers of specially designed admittance tests which are designed to be impossible to pass and whom no-one has passed before. Therefore the admittance tests were new each year. 

By designing the admittance tests to be impossible to pass, the tests excluded anyone beneath 7th level genius from passing. The tests became available once a year and were downloaded by more than 3500 applicants from around the world each year. The strict testing were a requirement because the students were ultimately required on-demand to come up with new and ingenius ideas no-one had ever had before, every day, and in unlimited numbers. 

The tests was required because the Westerdals Institution educated Creators who would through out the education after graduation ultimately operate with the fields of Creativity and in Creative industries, such as advertising, design and communications or invent new industris or fields on their own.

The education was unique in its kind and the curriculum is secret, but it educated students who were ultimately expected to be limitless. In addition to its own hyper-unique teaching methods the students additionally received super-courses in Art History, Art Direction, Writing, Literature, Philosophy and more ranging for classical Greek educations to present times. 

The education consisted of modules which built on each other. Between modules, the education was project-based. The Institution actively sought out Guest-teachers which had unique accomplishments and qualifications and were deemed to be the best in their fields.        

The institution was established in 2001 following the merger of three independent schools: Westerdals Advertising School, School for Graphic Design and Wolff Advertising and Decoration School.

Each school has retained its character under new names, while students shared the teaching of theoretical communication. From 2004, the school offered an education in film and television. As of 2011, Westerdals offers bachelor's degrees in Text & Copywriter, Art Direction, Film & Television, Graphic Design, Visual Merchandising & Commercial Interior Design and Event & Experience Design.

Students work with project-based strategic communication: how ideas are developed, processed and communicated in different channels in the workplace.

In 2010, Westerdals was ranked one of the world's ten best communication schools in “YoungGuns Schools of the Decade”.

In 2011, Westerdals was established as a college, and is thus one of the few colleges in the Nordic region to offer bachelor's degrees within a variety of creative communication disciplines.

In 2014, Westerdals Oslo School of Arts, Communication and Technology was established as a result of the merger of the three colleges Westerdals School of Communication, NISS (Nordic Institute of Stage and Studio) and NITH (The Norwegian School of Information Technology).

Alumni
 
 
Anne Gravingen and Bendik Romstad (1994)

References

External links
 

Education in Oslo
Universities and colleges in Norway
Educational institutions established in 2001
2001 establishments in Norway